Sheikha Hind bint Maktoum bin Juma Al Maktoum (born 12 February 1962) is the senior wife and consort of Sheikh Mohammed bin Rashid Al Maktoum, the ruler of Dubai. They were married on 26 April 1979. She is the mother of 12 of her husband's thirty children, including his heir apparent, Hamdan bin Mohammed Al Maktoum, the Crown Prince of Dubai.

Family
Sheikha Hind is the paternal granddaughter of Sheikh Juma bin Maktoum Al Maktoum, brother of Emir Saeed II of Dubai, grandfather of the current Sheikh. She is also the niece of Sheikh Ahmad Bin Juma Al Maktoum, who died in 2009.

Her mother, Sheikha Shaikha bint Saeed bin Maktoum Al Maktoum (who died on 28 January 2017), was the daughter of Emir Saeed II of Dubai, making Sheikha Hind a first cousin of her husband through her mother as well as second cousin of her husband through her father.

Marriage
In 1979, Hind bint Maktoum married her cousin, Sheikh Mohammed bin Rashid. Their wedding was Dubai's first major public event. Elaborate arrangements were made to celebrate the event. A 20,000 seater stadium was built to host the wedding, which featured displays of horse and camel riding, and an aerobatics display by the Dubai Air Force. The total cost of the wedding celebrations was estimated to be around $100 million. Her photograph has never been shown publicly.

Being the Sheikh's senior wife and consort, Sheikha Hind is the ruling family's chief matriarch and resides with her family in the Zabeel Palace (Ruler's Palace) in Dubai. He is divorced from the rest of the wives. Sheikha Hind oversees the upbringing of her children and the orphans she has adopted.

Children
Sheikha Hind has 12 children:

Sheikha Hind Women's Sport Tournament
The tournament was launched on 17 December 2012, at the Dubai World Trade Centre, and was organized by the Women's Sport Committee of the Dubai Sports Council, under the patronage of Sheikha Hind, and the guidance of her son, Sheikh Hamdan, the Crown Prince of Dubai and Chairman of Dubai Sports Council (DSC). The sports tournament is meant to encourage women to come out and actively participate in fitness and sports activities.

Charity work and donations
In January 2013, Sheikha Hind donated three planes to airlift the United Arab Emirates national football team’s fans from Manama in Bahrain to Dubai following UAE's 1-0 victory over Kuwait in the semi-final of the 21st Arabian Gulf Cup.

In June 2013, The Mohammed bin Rashid Charity and Humanitarian Establishment distributed 4100 smart cards of Ramadan Ration by donation of Sheikha Hind bint Maktoum in its charitable programmes for the Holy Month of Ramadan, aiming at distributing basic foodstuff to the needy and poor families in the emirate of Dubai and northern areas. Ibrahim Boumelha, Vice Chairman of the Board of Trustees of the Foundation, expressed his gratitude and thanks to Sheikha Hind for her moral and material support for various charitable projects, undertaken by the Foundation for the benefit of the citizens and residents expatriates, particularly during Ramadan.

References 

Maktoum family
Living people
Spouses of prime ministers of the United Arab Emirates
1962 births
People from Dubai
Women from Dubai